This is the list of extremely hazardous substances defined in Section 302 of the U.S. Emergency Planning and Community Right-to-Know Act (42 U.S.C. 11002). The list can be found as an appendix to 40 C.F.R. 355.  Updates as of 2006 can be seen on the Federal Register, 71 FR 47121 (August 16, 2006).

The data were provided by the United States Environmental Protection Agency (EPA). 



A 
 Acetone cyanohydrin
 Acetone thiosemicarbazide
 Acrolein
 Acrylamide
 Acrylonitrile
 Acryloyl chloride
 Adiponitrile
 Aldicarb
 Aldrin
 Allyl alcohol
 Allylamine
 Aluminum phosphide
 Aminopterin
 Amiton
 Amiton oxalate
 Ammonia
 Amphetamine
 Aniline
 Aniline, 2,4,6-trimethyl-
 Antimony pentafluoride
 Antimycin A
 ANTU (Alpha-Naphthylthiourea)
 Arsenic pentoxide
 Arsenous oxide
 Arsenous trichloride
 Arsine
 Azinphos-ethyl
 Azinphos-methyl

B 
 Benzal chloride
 Benzenamine, 3-(trifluoromethyl)-
 Benzenearsonic acid
 Benzimidazole, 4,5-dichloro-2-(trifluoromethyl)-
 Benzotrichloride
 Benzyl chloride
 Benzyl cyanide
 Bicyclo(2.2.1)heptane-2-carbonitrile
 Bis(chloromethyl) ketone
 Bitoscanate
 Boron trichloride
 Boron trifluoride
 Boron trifluoride compound with dimethyl ether (1:1)
 Bromadiolone
 Bromine

C 
 Cadmium oxide
 Cadmium stearate
 Calcium arsenate
 Camphechlor
 Cantharidin
 Carbachol chloride
 Carbamic acid, Methyl-, O-(((2,4-Dimethyl-1,3-Dithiolan-2-yl)Methylene)Amino)- (Tirpate)
 Carbofuran
 Carbon disulfide
 Carbophenothion
 Chlordane
 Chlorfenvinfos
 Chlorine
 Chlormephos
 Chlormequat chloride
 Chloroacetic acid
 2-chloroethanol
 Chloroethyl chloroformate
 Chloroform
 Chloromethyl ether
 Chloromethyl methyl ether
 Chlorophacinone
 Chloroxuron
 Chlorthiophos
 Chromic chloride
 Cobalt carbonyl
 Colchicine
 Coumaphos
 Cresol, -o
 Crimidine
 Crotonaldehyde
 Crotonaldehyde, (E)-
 Cyanogen bromide
 Cyanogen iodide
 Cyanophos
 Cyanuric fluoride
 Cycloheximide
 Cyclohexylamine

D 
 Decaborane(14)
 Demeton
 Demeton-S-methyl
 Dialifor
 Diborane
 Dichloroethyl ether
 Dichloromethylphenylsilane
 Dichlorvos
 Dicrotophos
 Diepoxybutane
 Diethyl chlorophosphate
 Digitoxin
 Diglycidyl ether
 Digoxin
 Dimefox
 Dimethoate
 Dimethyl phosphorochloridothioate
 Dimethyl-p-phenylenediamine
 Dimethyldichlorosilane
 Dimethylhydrazine
 Dimetilan
 Dinitrocresol
 Dinoseb
 Dinoterb
 Dioxathion
 Diphacinone
 Disulfoton
 Dithiazanine iodide
 Dithiobiuret

E 
 Endosulfan
 Endothion
 Endrin
 Epichlorohydrin
 EPN, or O-Ethyl-O-(4-nitrophenyl)phenylthiophosphonate
 Ergocalciferol
 Ergotamine tartrate
 Ethanesulfonyl chloride, 2-chloro-
 Ethanol, 1,2-dichloro-, acetate
 Ethion
 Ethoprophos
 Ethylbis(2-chloroethyl)amine
 Ethylene fluorohydrin
 Ethylene oxide
 Ethylenediamine
 Ethyleneimine
 Ethylthiocyanate

F 
 Fenamiphos
 Fenitrothion
 Fensulfothion
 Fluenetil
Fluomine
 Fluorine
 Fluoroacetamide
 Fluoroacetic acid
 Fluoroacetyl chloride
 Fluorouracil
 Fonofos
 Formaldehyde
 Formaldehyde cyanohydrin
 Formetanate hydrochloride
 Formothion
 Formparanate
 Fosthietan
 Fuberidazole
 Furan

G 
 Gallium trichloride

H 
 Hexachlorocyclopentadiene
 Hexamethylenediamine, N,N'-dibutyl-
 Hydrazine
 Hydrocyanic acid
 Hydrogen chloride (gas only)
 Hydrogen fluoride
 Hydrogen peroxide (conc > 52%)
 Hydrogen selenide
 Hydrogen sulfide
 Hydroquinone

I 
 Iron pentacarbonyl
 Isobenzan
 Isocyanic acid, 3,4-dichlorophenyl ester
 Isodrin
 Isophorone diisocyanate
 Isopropylmethylpyrazolyl dimethylcarbamate

L 
 Lactonitrile
 Leptophos
 Lewisite
 Lindane
 Lithium hydride

M 
 Malononitrile
 Manganese, tricarbonyl methylcyclopentadienyl
 Mechlorethamine
 Mercuric acetate
 Mercuric chloride
 Mercuric oxide
 Methacrolein diacetate
 Methacrylic anhydride
 Methacrylonitrile
 Methacryloyl chloride
 Methacryloyloxyethyl isocyanate
 Methamidophos
 Methanesulfonyl fluoride
 Methidathion
 Methiocarb
 Methomyl
 Methoxyethylmercuric acetate
 Methyl 2-chloroacrylate
 Methyl bromide
 Methyl chloroformate
 Methyl hydrazine
 Methyl isocyanate
 Methyl isothiocyanate
 Methyl phenkapton
 Methyl phosphonic dichloride
 Methyl thiocyanate
 Methyl vinyl ketone
 Methylmercuric dicyanamide
 Methyltrichlorosilane
 Metolcarb
 Mevinphos
 Mexacarbate
 Mitomycin C
 Monocrotophos
 Muscimol
 Mustard gas

N 
 Nickel carbonyl
 Nicotine
 Nicotine sulfate
 Nitric oxide
 Nitrobenzene
 Nitrocyclohexane
 Nitrogen dioxide
 N-Nitrosodimethylamine
 Norbormide

O 
 Organorhodium complex
 Ouabain
 Oxamyl
 Oxetane, 3,3-bis(chloromethyl)-
 Oxydisulfoton

P 
 Paraquat
 Paraquat methosulfate
 Parathion
 Parathion-methyl
 Paris green
 Pentaborane
 Pentadecylamine
 Peracetic acid
 Perchloromethylmercaptan
 Phenol
 Phenol, 2,2'-thiobis(4-chloro-6-methyl)-
 Phenol, 3-(1-methylethyl)-, methylcarbamate
 Phenoxarsine, 10,10'-oxydi-
 Phenyl dichloroarsine
 Phenylhydrazine hydrochloride
 Phenylmercury acetate
 Phenylsilatrane
 Phenylthiourea
 Phosacetim
 Phosfolan
 Phosgene
 Phosmet
 Phosphamidon
 Phosphine
 Phosphonothioic acid, methyl-, O-ethyl O-(4-(methylthio)phenyl) ester 
 Phosphonothioic acid, methyl-, S-(2-(bis(1-methylethyl)amino)ethyl) O-ethyl ester 
 Phosphonothioic acid, methyl-, O-(4-nitrophenyl) O-phenyl ester 
 Phosphoric acid, dimethyl 4-(methylthio)phenyl ester 
 Phosphonothioic acid, O,O-dimethyl-S-(2-methylthio) ethyl ester 
 Phosphorus
 Phosphorus oxychloride
 Phosphorus pentachloride
 Phosphorus trichloride
 Physostigmine
 Physostigmine, salicylate (1:1)
 Picrotoxin
 Piperidine
 Pirimifos-ethyl
 Plutonium
 Polonium-210
 Potassium arsenite
 Potassium cyanide
 Potassium silver cyanide
 Promecarb
 Propargyl bromide
 Propionitrile
 Propionitrile, 3-chloro-
 Propiophenone, 4'-amino-
 Propyleneimine
 Prothoate
 Pyrene
 Pyridine, 4-amino-
 Pyridine, 4-nitro-, 1-oxide
 Pyriminil

R 
 Ricin

S 
 Salcomine
 Sarin
 Selenious acid
 Semicarbazide hydrochloride
 Silane, (4-aminobutyl)diethoxymethyl-
 Sodium arsenate
 Sodium azide
 Sodium cacodylate
 Sodium cyanide
 Sodium fluoroacetate
 Sodium pentachlorophenate
 Sodium selenate
 Sodium selenite
 Stannane, acetoxytriphenyl-
 Strychnine
 Strychnine sulfate
 Sulfotep
 Sulfoxide, 3-chloropropyl octyl
 Sulfur dioxide
 Sulfur tetrafluoride
 Sulfur trioxide
 Sulfuric acid

T 
 Tabun
 Tellurium
 Tellurium hexafluoride
 TEPP
 Terbufos
 Tetraethyllead
 Tetraethyltin
 Tetranitromethane
 Thallium sulfate
 Thallous carbonate
 Thallous chloride
 Thallous malonate
 Thallous sulfate
 Thiocarbazide
 Thiofanox
 Thionazin
 Thiophenol
 Thiosemicarbazide
 Thiourea, (2-chlorophenyl)-
 Thiourea, (2-methylphenyl)-
 Titanium tetrachloride
 Toluene 2,4-diisocyanate
 Toluene 2,6-diisocyanate
 Trans-1,4-dichlorobutene
 Triamiphos
 Triazofos
 Trichloro(chloromethyl)silane
 Trichloro(dichlorophenyl)silane
 Trichloroacetyl chloride
 Trichloroethylsilane
 Trichloronate
 Trichlorophenylsilane
 Triethoxysilane
 Trimethylchlorosilane
 Trimethylolpropane phosphite
 Trimethyltin chloride
 Triphenyltin chloride
 Tris(2-chloroethyl)amine

V 
 Valinomycin
 Vinyl acetate monomer

W 
 Warfarin
 Warfarin sodium

X 
 Xylylene dichloride

Z 
 Zinc phosphide

See also 
 List of highly toxic gases

References 

 

United States Environmental Protection Agency
Poisons
Chemical compounds
Extremely hazardous substances
Toxicology